Stephanie Devillé (born 24 July 1976) is a former professional tennis player from Belgium.

Biography
Born in Antwerp, Devillé began playing tennis at the age of six and was coached by Christophe Delzenne. She was a member of the Belgian team which won the 1992 World Youth Cup (now known as Junior Fed Cup), along with Laurence Courtois and Nancy Feber.

In 1996 she had her breakthrough year on tour. After winning ITF tournaments in Bordeaux and Budapest, she made her WTA Tour main draw debut in Palermo, as a qualifier. She defeated Sandra Cecchini in the first round, then was rewarded her second round match against Irina Spîrlea when the Romanian was defaulted for swearing in the first game of the deciding set. Her run ended with a three-set loss to Jana Kandarr in the quarter-finals. She improved on that performance by making the semi-finals of the Styrian Open later in the season, then made it through qualifying at the 1996 US Open to feature in the main draw of a grand slam for the first time. She won her third ITF title of the year at Sedona and improved her ranking from 279 to 74 by the end of the season.

At the 1997 Australian Open she overcame Denisa Chládková in the first round, 8–6 in the third set, then suffered the disappointment of having to retire hurt against Arantxa Sánchez Vicario in the second round. With only one game completed, Devillé went down with a sprained ankle and was unable to carry on. She didn't return to action until March and that month reached her career best ranking of 61. From 1998 she played mainly on the ITF circuit.

Devillé has commentated on tennis for RTBF and also coaches tennis locally.

ITF Circuit finals

Singles: 11 (8–3)

Doubles: 1 (1–0)

References

External links
 
 

1976 births
Living people
Belgian female tennis players
Sportspeople from Antwerp
20th-century Belgian women